The Karori Crematorium and its adjacent chapel are located in Karori Cemetery in the Wellington suburb of Karori. The crematorium was the first such facility in New Zealand, and it opened in 1909. The Karori Crematorium and chapel are registered by the New Zealand Historic Places Trust as Category I heritage items, with registration number 1399.

The Commonwealth War Graves Commission (CWGC) erected a plaque commemorating 15 New Zealand services personnel of World War II who were cremated at the crematorium and their ashes scattered. It is set into the Services Columbarium Wall in the Services section of Karori Cemetery.

References

Crematoria in New Zealand
Heritage New Zealand Category 1 historic places in the Wellington Region
1900s architecture in New Zealand